"Masterpiece" is the debut album from British R&B singer Nathan. The album was released on 9 October 2006 in the UK. The album features four singles including "Round and Round", "Cold as Ice", the top 40 hit "Come into My Room" and the latest single "Do Without my Love".

Track listing
 Round And Round
 Get To Know You Better 
 Kiss Me 
 The Right Way
 Do Without My Love
 Snatch
 Come Into My Room
 What's Your Name
 They Can't Take Me Away
 Cold As Ice
 Masterpiece Pt. 1
 You Make Me Feel 
 Everybody Needs Somebody 
 Masterpiece Pt. 2 
 Just Wanna Love You 
 Cold As Ice (Salaam Mix) (featuring Rick Ross)
 We Got It (hidden track)

Chart performance

Release history

References

2006 debut albums